Justice for Peace and National Development (Justice pour la Paix et le Développement National)  is a political party in Haiti. The party won in the 7 February 2006 Senate elections 3.3% of the popular vote and no Senators. In the 7 February and 21 April 2006 Chamber of Deputies elections, the party won no seats.

Political parties in Haiti
Political parties with year of establishment missing